Paratmeticus is a monotypic genus of Asian dwarf spiders containing the single species, Paratmeticus bipunctis. It was first described by Y. M. Marusik & S. Koponen in 2010, and has only been found in Russia and Japan.

See also
 List of Linyphiidae species (I–P)

References

Linyphiidae
Monotypic Araneomorphae genera
Spiders of Asia
Spiders of Russia